Nicholas Suman (born 28 February 2000), is an Australian professional footballer who plays as a goalkeeper for Macarthur.

Club career

Western Sydney Wanderers
In May 2017, Suman signed a one-year scholarship contract with Western Sydney Wanderers. In July 2018, his scholarship contract was extended by two years.

Macarthur FC
In September 2020, Suman joined new A-League club Macarthur ahead of their inaugural season.

Honours
Western Sydney Wanderers
Y-League: 2017–18

Macarthur
Australia Cup: 2022

Australia U20
AFF U-16 Youth Championship: 2016

References

External links

2000 births
Living people
Australian soccer players
Association football goalkeepers
Sydney United 58 FC players
Western Sydney Wanderers FC players
Macarthur FC players
A-League Men players
National Premier Leagues players